Dolalghat is a village development committee in Kabhrepalanchok District in Bagmati Province of central Nepal.

Demographics
At the time of the 1991 Nepal census it had a population of 1,714 and had 323 houses in it.

Transport
It is linked by Araniko Highway which joins Kathmandu to Kodari.

References

External links
UN map of the municipalities of Kavrepalanchok District

Populated places in Kavrepalanchok District